Semino is both an Italian surname and a given name. Notable people with this name include:
Camilla Semino Favro (born 1986), Italian actress
Carlos Semino (1929-2014), Argentine rower
Elena Semino (born 1964), Italian-British linguist
Gustavo Semino (born 1977), Argentine footballer
Semino Rossi (born 1962), Argentine-Tyrolean schlager singer

Italian-language surnames